Events in the year 2023 in Hungary.

Incumbents
President: Katalin Novák
Prime Minister: Viktor Orbán
Speaker of the National Assembly: László Kövér

Events

January

 3 January - The Hungarian state-owned 4iG company buys Digi's Hungarian division.

9 January - 4iG buys 49% ownership of Vodafone Hungary.

February 

 12 February - Researchers at the Konkoly Observatory in Hungary discover 2023 CX1, a 1-metre (3.3-foot) asteroid predicted to fall harmlessly as a fireball over the English Channel at 03:00 UTC, making it the seventh asteroid to be discovered before impacting Earth.

Deaths

January

4 January - Géza Morcsányi, 70, playwright and actor (On Body and Soul).
9 January - Ferenc Mészáros, 72, footballer (Vasas SC, Vitória de Setúbal, national team).
14 January - Gáspár Miklós Tamás, 74, politician, member of the national assembly (1989–1994).
16 January - Ferenc Varga, 97, sprint canoer, Olympic bronze medalist (1952).

See also
List of Hungarian films since 1990

References

 
2020s in Hungary
Years of the 21st century in Hungary
Hungary
Hungary